A glen is a valley, typically one that is long and bounded by gently sloped concave sides, unlike a ravine, which is deep and bounded by steep slopes.  Whittow defines it as a "Scottish term for a deep valley in the Highlands" that is "narrower than a strath". The word is Goidelic in origin: gleann in Irish and Scottish Gaelic, glion in Manx. The designation "glen" also occurs often in place names.

Etymology 

The word is Goidelic in origin: gleann in Irish and Scottish Gaelic, glion in Manx. In Manx, glan is also to be found meaning glen. It is cognate with Welsh glyn.

Examples in Northern England, such as Glenridding, Westmorland, or Glendue, near Haltwhistle, Northumberland, are thought to derive from the aforementioned Cumbric cognate, or another Brythonic equivalent. This likely underlies some examples in Southern Scotland.

As the name of a river, it is thought to derive from the Irish word glan meaning clean, or the Welsh word gleindid meaning purity. An example is the Glens of Antrim in Northern Ireland where nine glens radiate out from the Antrim plateau to the sea along the coast between Ballycastle and Larne.

Places 
The designation "glen" also occurs often in place names such as Great Glen and Glenrothes in Scotland; Glendalough, Glenswilly, Glen of Aherlow, Glen of Imaal and the Glens of Antrim in Ireland; Glenn Norman in Canada; Glendale, Glen Ellen and Klamath Glen in California, Glenview in Illinois, and Glenrock in Wyoming; Glenview, Glen Waverley, Glen Eira, Glengowrie, Glen Huntly and Glen Forrest in Australia; and Glendowie, Glen Eden and Glen Innes in New Zealand.

In the Finger Lakes region of New York State, the southern ends of Seneca Lake and Cayuga Lake in particular are etched with glens, although in this region the term "glen" refers most frequently to a narrow gorge, as opposed to a wider valley or strath. The steep hills surrounding these lakes are filled with loose shale from glacial moraines. This material has eroded over the past 10,000 years to produce rocky glens (e.g., Watkins Glen, Fillmore Glen State Park and Treman State Parks) and waterfalls (e.g., Taughannock Falls) as rainwater has flowed down toward the lakes below.

See also

References 

 
Landforms
Slope landforms
Valleys